Fort Logan National Cemetery is a United States National Cemetery in Denver, Colorado. Fort Logan, a former U.S. Army installation, was named after Union General John A. Logan, commander of US Volunteer forces during the American Civil War. It contains  and has over 122,000 interments as of 2014.  It was listed on the National Register of Historic Places in 2016.

History
Fort Logan itself was established on October 31, 1887, and was in continuous use until 1946 when most of the acreage except for the cemetery was turned over to the state of Colorado. The national cemetery was created in 1950.

Notable burials
 Medal of Honor recipients
 Major William E. Adams (1939–1971) – U.S. Army, Company A, 227th Aviation Battalion (Assault Helicopter); 52d Aviation Battalion (Combat), 1st Aviation Brigade. Kontum Province, Republic of Vietnam.
 Private John Davis (1838–1901) – Company F, 17th Indiana Mounted Infantry. Culloden, Georgia, April 1865 (Civil War) (cenotaph)
 First Sergeant Maximo Yabes (1932–1967) – U.S. Army, Company A, 4th Battalion, 9th Infantry, 25th Infantry Division. Phu Hoa Dong, Republic of Vietnam
 Others
 George R. Caron (1919–1995) – tail gunner on the Enola Gay
 John A. Carroll (1901–1995) – United States Representative and Senator
 Joanne Conte (1933–2013) – Transgender woman. As Joseph Baione, Conte served as a military Morse code operator for the U.S. Army and Air Force during the Korean War.
 John F. Curry (1886–1973) – Major General and first commander of the Civil Air Patrol
 Steven Curnow (1984–1999) – Columbine High School massacre victim. Aspired to join the Air Force after graduation.
 Danny Dietz (1980–2005) – US Navy Seal. Littleton CO native, perished in Operation Red Wings.
 Arthur Harvey (1895–1976) – oil pioneer and a veteran of World War I and World War II
 Byron "Mex" Johnson (1911–2005) – Negro league baseball player
 Richard H. Kindig (1916–2008) – photographer noted for documenting the rail transport industry of Colorado and the Rocky Mountains
 Ernest Klingbeil (1908–1995) – professional hockey player
 Fitzroy Newsum (1918–2013) – original member of the Tuskegee Airmen
 John Powers Severin (1921-2012) -- renowned comic book artist (notably for EC Comics, Marvel Comics and Cracked)
 Dorothy L. Starbuck (1917–1996) – Women's Army Corps officer and Veteran's Administration civil servant.
 Karl H. Timmermann (1922–1951) – commanded the unit which captured the Rhine River's Ludendorff Bridge at Remagen during World War II
 Kyle Velasquez (1982–1999) – Columbine High School massacre victim. Aspired to join the Navy after graduation.

Gallery

See also
 National Register of Historic Places listings in West Denver
 List of cemeteries in Colorado

References

External links

 Fort Logan National Cemetery website
 Gravesite Locator (for all national cemeteries) 
 Friends of Historic Fort Logan
 
 
 

Cemeteries in Colorado
Geography of Denver
Cemeteries on the National Register of Historic Places in Colorado
Military and war museums in Colorado
United States national cemeteries
Protected areas of Denver
Historic American Landscapes Survey in Colorado
1887 establishments in Colorado
National Register of Historic Places in Denver